Certified Financial Planner Board of Standards, Inc. (CFP Board) is an American 501(c)(3) certifying and standards-setting organization that administers the Certified Financial Planner certification program and oversees more than 89,000 professionals using the CFP® certification in the United States.

CFP Board History
CFP Board was founded in 1985 as a non-profit organization that has been granted 501(c)(3) status by the Internal Revenue Service, and thus operates within limitations that prevent it from engaging in aggressive lobbying activities.

CFP certification worldwide
In 1990, CFP Board established the International CFP Council.

In 2004, the board established the Financial Planning Standards Board (FPSB),  A nonprofit, international standards-setting body, FPSB manages, develops and operates certification, education and related programs for financial planning organizations so that they may benefit and protect the global community by establishing, upholding and promoting worldwide professional standards in personal financial planning. FPSB uses the CFP and CERTIFIED FINANCIAL PLANNER and CFP (with flame logo) trademarks, which FPSB owns outside the United States. .

As of April 2010, FPSB has members and associate members from 23 territories around the world, including CFP Board, which joined FPSB in 2008. Collectively, FPSB members have authorized more than 126,000 individuals to use the CFP marks in their respective countries and regions.

CFP Board’s certification requirements 
CFP Board awards CFP certification in the United States to individuals who meet its initial and ongoing certification requirements. Initial certification requirements include the “4 E’s”:

 Education: More than 200 institutions across the United States offer educational programs that satisfy CFP Board's education coursework requirement and qualify individuals to take the CFP Certification Examination. Applicants for CFP certification must also hold a qualified bachelor's degree.
 Examination: The CFP Certification Examination is offered three times a year at more than 50 locations across the United States. Approximately 3,000-4,000 individuals take the exam each year, and the pass rate for each exam administration has varied from 56% to 66% over the past decade. The comprehensive 10-hour exam was introduced for CFP certificants in 1991; prior to that point those applying for certification were only required to complete examinations for the individual course units. In November 2014, the CFP exam was  converted from a paper-based exam to a computer-based exam, and the duration cut from 10 hours down to 6, with the number of questions similarly being reduced by 40% from 285 to 170.
 Experience: Applicants for CFP certification must complete at least three years of full-time experience delivering all or part of the financial planning process to clients. As an alternative, beginning on September 1, 2012, applicants can satisfy the experience requirement with a 2-year "apprenticeship" period, which must include experience in the personal delivery of all six elements of financial planning under the direct supervision of a CFP professional.
 Ethics: Applicants for CFP certification must agree to abide by CFP Board's Standards of Professional Conduct and consent to CFP Board's authority to enforce those standards.

CFP certification must be renewed biannually by completing ongoing certification requirements, including continuing education and continued adherence to CFP Board's Standards of Professional Conduct. CFP Board's certification requirements are amended from time to time.

In March 2010, the CFP Board adopted a new “Financial Plan Development Course” requirement. Future applicants must take a new course that demonstrates the ability to deliver professional and competent financial planning services to the public. This "Capstone" course requirement took effect for all students with matriculation dates after January 1, 2012, and for those who apply for "Challenge" status after March 2012; with changes announced in December 2014, though, the Capstone requirement will no longer apply for Challengers after July 1, 2015.

Standards of professional conduct 
Individuals who hold CFP certification agree to abide by a set of documents collectively referred to as CFP Board's Standards of Professional Conduct (the Standards), including a Code of Ethics and Professional Responsibility, Rules of Conduct, Financial Planning Practice Standards and Candidate Fitness Standards.

The CFP Board adopted its first code of ethics in 1986. In 2006, the CFP Board's release of proposed changes to the Standards generated controversy within the financial planning profession by introducing a fiduciary standard of care that was negotiable. Following two public comment periods, the Board adopted a set of revisions that included a non-negotiable fiduciary standard of care for financial planning services

The CFP Board enforces the Standards through a process outlined in its Disciplinary Rules and Procedures. Hearings for cases involving alleged violation of the Standards are held by CFP Board's Disciplinary and Ethics Commission, which can impose discipline where appropriate. Disciplinary actions taken by CFP Board, in order of increasing severity, include private censures, public letters of admonition, suspensions, and permanent revocations.

The Financial Planning Coalition 
In December 2008, CFP Board entered into a collaboration with the Financial Planning Association and National Association of Personal Financial Advisors (NAPFA) to create the Financial Planning Coalition with the goal of representing financial planners as the U.S. government works to reform the financial services industry.

CFP Board and the public 
In 2006, the Board hosted its first Financial Planning Clinic in the Los Angeles area, allowing participant to attend workshops and hold private consultations with volunteer CFP professionals at no cost. Since 2006, additional Financial Planning Clinics have been held in Boston, Chicago, Detroit, Las Vegas, Miami, Oakland, San Francisco and Washington, D.C.

Certifications, designations and degrees

The CFP mark is a "Board Certification" or professional designation offered to those who meet the requirements for certification and who pass the CFP exam. CFP Board of Standards does not award degrees or a diploma; however, CFP Board works with degree granting educational institutions worldwide. CFP Board has a registered provider system of colleges that offer the financial planning courses. Those registered programs that offer CFP educational courses are listed on CFP Board's website. There is a College for Financial Planning that is a degree granting body.

References

External links 

 CFP mark 
 CFP exam.

External links 
CFP Board official Website CFP Board

Professional certification in finance
Personal finance
Non-profit organizations based in Washington, D.C.
Organizations established in 1985
501(c)(3) organizations
1985 establishments in the United States